Jean-Baptiste Philippe Constant Moens (27 May 1833, Tournai – 28 April 1908) was a Belgian philatelist recognized as the first dealer in stamps for collectors. He was one of the original philatelic journalists.

Youth 
Moens began collecting stamps from his family's mail as a boy in Tournai. He was the son of Colette Blangenois and Phillipe Moens, a soldier. He began with a small business in coins. By 1853, at age nineteen, he was buying and selling new and second-hand books, and stamps, from the Galerie Borthier, a covered walkway in central Brussels. Within a decade he was putting out a stamp catalog with illustrated supplements.

First catalogue 
In March 1862, with Louis Hanciau, Moens published a catalog of stamps, the Manuel des collectionneurs de timbres-poste (Handbook for Stamp Collectors). This work is the first of its kind in Belgium and the second in the French language, following that of the Parisian, Alfred Potiquet. Also in 1862, he published De la falsification des timbres-poste (On the falsification of postage stamps) to alert stamp enthusiasts to the abundance of forgeries. He began the first French language philatelic monthly, Le Timbre-Poste, which ran from 1863 until 1900, as well as a series on fiscal stamps from 1874 until 1896.

The Mauritius "Post Office" stamps 
Moens became the owner of eight of the "Post Office" Mauritius stamps. In 1878 Moens published the first of his works on the early stamps of Mauritius, Les Timbres de Maurice depuis leur origine jusqu'à nos jours, (The Stamps of Mauritius from their Origin until Today), benefiting from the studies of Edward B. Evans, the Philatelic Society of London, and Judge Frederick Philbrick. Helen Morgan noted, "All that is known of the discovery of the first specimens of the Post Office issue, indeed of much of the history of the handful of those stamps eventually found, came from his pen in the late 1890s. He handled most of the Post Office stamps discovered by Madame Borchard in the late 1860s."

Organised philately 
Moens was an Honorary Member of the Fiscal Philatelic Society until his death.

Retirement 
As Moens' business prospered, he assembled a large stock of collectibles of all kinds and a library devoted to music and antiquities, as well as stamps. By 1 November 1899, to preserve his health, Jean-Baptiste announced in Le Timbre-poste that the time had come to free himself from the duties of publication and to liquidate most of his stock in trade. After selling his rarities, the residue of Moens' stock, with a catalogue value of £196,000 (1882 catalogue), was sold the following year to M Rubens, a stamp dealer of Copenhagen for an undisclosed figure. His philatelic publications were eventually sold to H. Edgar Weston, in London, in 1907.

Death 
Jean-Baptiste Moens died in Ixelles in 1908 and was interred there in the Ixelles Cemetery. His passing was noted by the philatelic press, many referring to him as The Father of Philately.

References

Further reading
 Leclercq A. and G. Waroquiers. Jean Baptiste Moens, 1833-1908: La nomenclature de son oeuvre avec criteres de rarete. Bruxelles: Les editions Corneille Soereman, 1981 58p.
 Phillips, Charles J. 	The First Stamp Dealer: M. Jeane Baptiste Philippe Constant Moens. Stamps. Feb. 1933 p. 81.
 Winchester, John. Jean-Baptiste Moens 1833–1908: One famous Belgian! Stamp Magazine. Vol. 74 No. 5 (May 2008), pp. 68–71.

External links

  Université Libre de Bruxelles (archive.org) (Fr).

1833 births
1908 deaths
People from Tournai
Belgian businesspeople
Stamp dealers
Belgian philatelists
Philatelic fakes and forgeries
Burials at Ixelles Cemetery
Fathers of philately
Philatelic authors